Janusz Turowski may refer to:

 Janusz Turowski (footballer) (born 1961), Polish football coach and player
 Janusz Turowski (professor) (1927–2020), Polish engineer